Well-Schooled in Murder is a crime novel by Elizabeth George, published by Bantam in 1990. It was the third book in her Inspector Lynley series, which originated in 1988 with A Great Deliverance. In 2002 its screen adaptation was broadcast as the first episode of season one in The Inspector Lynley Mysteries, a BBC TV series.

Set in the late 1980s at an elite public school in the South of England founded in 1489, the book, which is a mystery novel in the tradition of the whodunnit, revolves around the strict yet unwritten code of behaviour prevalent at independent schools which says that under no circumstances must pupils ever tell on their schoolmates, no matter what they have done. Accordingly, when a 13-year-old boy goes missing one Friday afternoon and two days later is found dead in a churchyard an hour's drive away, Detective Inspector Thomas Lynley and his partner, Detective Sergeant Barbara Havers, both of the Criminal Investigation Department of New Scotland Yard, are up against a wall of silence as none of the 600 pupils of Bredgar Chambers School seems to be willing to co-operate with the police and communicate what they know.

Plot summary

Teacher John Corntel asks his former Eton schoolmate Lynley for help when the 13 year old schoolboy Matthew Whateley has disappeared. Initially Lynley refuses, until Deborah St James finds the naked body of the boy in a churchyard in Stoke Poges. Lynley and Havers start their investigation at Matthew's school Bredgar Chambers, an elite boarding school in West Sussex.

They find a letter from Matthew to Jeannie Bonnamy, a daughter of Colonel Bonnamy. Matthew has visited them three days before his death to dine and play chess with the colonel. When Jeannie brought Matthew back to school, they saw 6th form student Chas Quilter in a school minibus, returning from a visit to Cecilia Feld, a girl in Stoke Poges. Chas didn't want anyone to find out about his relationship with Cecilia, and the fact that he was the father of Cecilia's child, which has Apert syndrome. Cecilia herself was transferred from Bredgar Chambers to another school when she was pregnant.

Chemistry teacher Emilia Bond tried to burn child pornography photos that belonged to John Corntel; she was in love with Corntel, but found out he was collecting those photos. This explains why Corntel didn't patrol in spite of being duty master. That same evening 6th grader Clive Pritchard nabbed Matthew Whateley to torture him, because Matthew had made a tape recording of Clive bullying schoolboy Harry Morant. When Clive found Matthew dead he felt responsible, unaware that the cause of death was carbon monoxide poisoning.

During the investigation there's an attempt to kill Jeannie Bonnamy with a rake. Chas Quilter hangs himself.

The investigators find out that Matthew's biological parents were Mrs Pamela Byrne and Edward Hsu, a Chinese former pupil at Bredgar Hall who killed himself after this scandal. Giles Byrne felt financially responsible for the child of his late wife. As a board member he obtained a scholarship for Matthew at Bredgar Chambers. Giles' 18-year-old son Brian turns out to be the culprit. He killed his half-brother in the fume cupboard in the chemistry lab. He then transported the body to Stoke Poges in the school minibus Chas Quilter was driving. His motive was to win Chas Quilter's lifetime loyalty. Brian also tried to kill Jeannie Bonnamy for the same reason. Brian Byrne and Clive Pritchard are arrested.

In a subplot Barbara Havers visits her demented mother, and finds her father dead. Another theme is Lynley's aristocratic descent (he is sometimes referred to as "Lord Asherton")—shown through his working relationship with his working class colleague Barbara Havers from Acton and his unrequited love for Deborah, his best friend's wife.

Characters

 DI Thomas Lynley
DS Barbara Havers
Jimmy Havers: Barbara's father
Mrs Havers: Barbara's mother
DI Mike Canerone
Simon Allcourt-St James: forensic scientist
Deborah St James: Simon's wife
Lady Helen Clyde: absent object of Lynley's affection
Matthew Whateley: 13-year-old schoolboy
Kevin Whateley: Matthew's adoptive father 
Patsy Whateley: Matthew's adoptive mother
Harry Morant: schoolmate of Matthew
Arlens: schoolmate of Matthew
Smythe-Andrews: schoolmate of Matthew
Chas Quilter: 6th grader
Clive Pritchard: 6th grader
Brian Byrne: 6th grader
Giles Byrne: Brian's father
Mrs Pamela Byrne: Brian's mother (deceased)
Alan Lockwood: headmaster
Mrs Kathleen Lockwood: Alan's wife
John Corntel: teacher, former Eton schoolmate of Lynley 
Emilia Bond: chemistry teacher
Cowfrey Pitt: German teacher
Judith Laughland: sanatorium sister
Frank Orten: porter
Elaine Roly: matron 
Colonel Bonnamy: lives in the neighbourhood of the school
Jeannie Bonnamy: Colonel's daughter
Yvonnen Livesley: Matthew's old mate from Hammersmith
Cecilia Feld: 17-year-old girl in Stoke Poges
Edward Hsu: former Chinese pupil who killed himself

Quote
We live by codes, he [Lynley] thought. We call them our morals, our standards, our values, our ethics, as if they were part of our genetic make up. But they are only behaviours that we have learned from our society, and there are times to act in defiance of them, to fly in the face of their conventions because it is right to do so.

Literary significance and reception
The Baltimore Sun wrote: "Ms. George has crafted a fine and powerful novel sure to delight readers in the mood for a thought-provoking, hard-hitting mystery."

People wrote: "Like P. D. James, George knows the import of the smallest human gesture; Well-Schooled in Murder puts the younger author clearly in the running with the genre's master."

Chicago Tribune: "George is a master [...] An outstanding  of the modern English mystery."

Los Angeles Times: "A spectacular new voice in mystery writing."

Daily News (New York): "A compelling whodunnit[...] A reader's delight."

Well-Schooled in Murder was awarded the MIMI, a German prize for suspense fiction.

TV adaption
Well Schooled in Murder was adapted and broadcast by the BBC in April 2002 as the first episode of season one in The Inspector Lynley Mysteries, following a 2001 pilot based on the inaugural Lynley novel A Great Deliverance. Several changes were made to the plot. Matthew's biological mother is Patsy Whateley instead of Pamela Byrne. Corntel is gay but doesn't actually collect child porn. Deborah and Simon St James are omitted. So is Cecilia Feld, and there's no mention of Chas Quilter having a child. Lorry driver Barry Summers is a new suspect.

Publication
1990, UK, Bantam Press, Pub date 25 October 1990, hardback (First edition)

Read on

Patrick Redmond: The Wishing Game
Stephen Dobyns: Boy in the Water
Joanne Harris: Gentlemen & Players
Generally, other books listed at School and university in literature
An incomplete list of mystery novels

References

1990 American novels
American mystery novels
Novels set in boarding schools
Bantam Books books